Dursun Karatay (born 5 October 1984) is an Austrian football player of Turkish descent who plays for an Austrian fourth-tier Vorarlbergliga club FC Koblach.

References

1984 births
People from Bludenz
Footballers from Vorarlberg
Austrian people of Turkish descent
Living people
Austrian footballers
Austria under-21 international footballers
Association football midfielders
Association football forwards
SC Austria Lustenau players
SK Austria Kärnten players
SC Rheindorf Altach players
Konyaspor footballers
USV Eschen/Mauren players
FC Lustenau players
FC Dornbirn 1913 players
SC Brühl players
2. Liga (Austria) players
Austrian Football Bundesliga players
TFF First League players
Swiss 1. Liga (football) players
Swiss Promotion League players
Austrian expatriate footballers
Expatriate footballers in Turkey
Austrian expatriate sportspeople in Turkey
Expatriate footballers in Liechtenstein
Austrian expatriate sportspeople in Liechtenstein
Expatriate footballers in Switzerland
Austrian expatriate sportspeople in Switzerland